Freeman Vineyard & Winery is a California winery based in the Southern Russian River Valley AVA just outside Sebastopol in Sonoma County.  The winery was founded in 2001 by Ken and Akiko Freeman. They are recognized for producing cool-climate Pinot noir and Chardonnay in a Burgundian style.

History
A graduate of Kellogg School of Management, Ken Freeman helped both Citigroup and UBS build their private equity placement business in the Western United States, Asia and Australia. Prior to that, Freeman helped to establish the Discovery Channel in Asia.  Today, he is the managing director at Knight Trading.

Ken and his Japanese wife, Akiko spent much of their married life in Asia before heading to Northern California to start their boutique Pinot Noir wine program.  Mrs. Freeman is the winemaker along with their consulting winemaker Ed Kurtzman.  The winery produces 4500 cases of Pinot Noir and Chardonnay with a large percentage exported to the Asian market.

References

External links
Freeman Winery [www.freemanwinery.com Official Site]
Knight Trading Company Official Site
Isle, Ray (April, 200). "World’s 30 Best Pinot Noirs” Food & Wine Magazine.
Asimov, Eric (June 28, 2006) “No More Slingshots at Goliath” NY Times

Wineries in California